Udo of Nellenburg (c. 1030 – 11 November 1078) was the Archbishop of Trier from 1066 until his death. He was an important mediator during the height of the Investiture Controversy.

Biography
Udo was born in Tübingen, Swabia, as the eldest son of Count Eberhard of Nellenburg. After the murder of Archbishop Cuno I of Trier, a foreigner, in early June 1066, the cathedral chapter elected Udo, one of their number to replace him.

In 1067, Udo received priestly consecration. Udo became a leading German voice in the campaign of Pope Alexander II against simony. Beginning in 1075, he became involved in the campaign against lay investiture being waged by Pope Gregory VII against the Emperor Henry IV. He was looked upon as a mediator in the dispute. He was, however, unable to maintain the peace, but still worked at a resolution. In August 1077, he negotiated a reconciliation between emperor and pope and maintained his own good terms with the Holy See. In March 1078, he received a letter from the pope asking him to work further for the establishment of peace. He died in 1078 while besieging Tübingen with an imperial army. He was eventually buried in Trier Cathedral.

Sources
 

Archbishops of Trier
11th-century Roman Catholic archbishops in the Holy Roman Empire
1030s births
1078 deaths
Year of birth uncertain